Bernie Tormé (born Bernard Joseph Tormey; 18 March 1952 – 17 March 2019) was an Irish rock guitarist, singer, songwriter, record label and recording studio owner. Tormé is best known for his work with Gillan, as well as his brief stint with Ozzy Osbourne replacing Randy Rhoads. He formed the band Desperado with Twisted Sister singer Dee Snider. He also toured with Atomic Rooster.

Early career
The Ranelagh-born Tormé was inspired by the likes of Jimi Hendrix, Jeff Beck, Rory Gallagher, and Gary Moore. He formed his first band at a young age. His first paid performance came when Don Harris, a 14-year-old drummer he played alongside when he was 17, secured a gig at the local Girl Guides' dance in Kilmainham in Dublin. Tormé then played in Dublin band The Urge in the early 1970s, before relocating to London in 1974, where he initially played with heavy rockers Scrapyard, whose bass player, John McCoy would later be re-united with Tormé in Gillan. Inspired by England's burgeoning mid-1970s punk rock scene, Tormé formed the Bernie Tormé Band in 1976. With this group, Tormé toured with successful groups of that period such as The Boomtown Rats and Billy Idol's Generation X, among many others. Tormé later revealed that his band secured the supporting slot with the Boomtown Rats, by agreeing to go around London putting up posters advertising the tour.

In 1977 the band were asked to contribute two tracks to the Live at the Vortex album, "Streetfighter" and "Living for Kicks". This led to them being signed to the Jet Records label, who "...paid us forty quid a week each for the next 18 months... Apart from that they just sat on us pretty much, they were more into ELO."

Gillan and Ozzy Osbourne
Tormé accepted the invitation of former Deep Purple vocalist Ian Gillan in 1979 to join his band Gillan. Over the next four years, Gillan enjoyed three Top Ten UK albums (Mr. Universe, Glory Road, and Future Shock), in addition to extensive worldwide tours of Europe, Japan, and the United States.

In 1981 Tormé left Gillan, citing frustration over a lack of money despite the success the band was seeing. He was replaced by guitarist Janick Gers. He played as a live session man for Atomic Rooster and was hired in March 1982 by Jet Records, to replace the recently deceased Randy Rhoads in Ozzy Osbourne's band. Tormé flew from England to Los Angeles with the promise that the job was his, even being paid an advance by Jet before leaving England. Although Osbourne had already settled on Robert Sarzo to replace Rhoads, he was forced to abide by the record company's decision and Tormé began rehearsing with the band. After only a handful of shows it became apparent that Tormé's bluesy style was not a good match for Osbourne's brand of heavy metal, and he elected to return to England to continue work on a solo album. He was quickly replaced by Brad Gillis and the tour continued.

Later career
Beginning in 1982, Tormé led his own band under various names and line-ups (including a version of Tormé with singer Phil Lewis, formerly of Girl and later with L.A. Guns).

Tormé spent several years with the band Desperado with former Twisted Sister singer Dee Snider. Although the record saw limited release, Snider re-used a number of the songs for a subsequent project, Widowmaker (not to be confused with the 1970s English band of the same name).

Tormé also played guitar on René Berg's solo album, The Leather, The Loneliness And Your Dark Eyes, released in 1992.

In addition to the continued release of new Tormé recordings and re-issuance of his back catalogue titles, Tormé also became involved with the 'Silver' project, which also included former Michael Schenker Group vocalist Gary Barden.

In 2006, Tormé announced the formation of Guy McCoy Tormé (aka "G.M.T"), with former Gillan bassist John McCoy and drummer Robin Guy. In 2007, Tormé contributed lead guitar and sitar parts to "Smile in Denial", track No. 4 of Yoni, a solo album from Wildhearts frontman Ginger.

Bernie successfully released 4 albums via the Pledgemusic platform between 2014 and 2018, and his last album 'Shadowland', featuring drummer Mik Gaffney (The Last Resort) and Sy Morton on bass was released in November 2018, followed by the 'Final Fling' UK tour starting on 22 November. Unfortunately Pledgemusic did not honour their outstanding payments to Bernie Tormé on his last release.

Tormé also ran his own record label, Retrowrek Records, and recording studios, Barnroom Studios in Kent.

Personal life
In February 2019, it was reported that Tormé was "extremely ill with virulent double pneumonia". He died on 17 March 2019, a day before he would have turned 67. He is survived by his wife Lisa Valder, and their children Jimi, Eric and Tuli, and his sister, Cliodna Murphy.

Discography

Solo
Bernie Tormé Band ― Live at the Vortex Vol.1 (2 tracks contributed to compilation) (1977)
Bernie Tormé Band ― "I'm Not Ready" (7") (1978)
Bernie Tormé Band ― Bernie Tormé Band (EP)  "Weekend"/"Secret Service"/"All Night"/"Instant Impact"  with Phil Spalding and Mark Harrison (1979)
Bernie Tormé And The Electric Gypsies ― Turn Out The Lights (1982) – UK No. 50
Bernie Tormé And The Electric Gypsies ― Electric Gypsies (1983) 
Tormé -  Back To Babylon (1986, With Phil Lewis)
Tormé -  Die Pretty, Die Young (1987, With Phil Lewis)
Tormé –  Demolition Ball (1993, With ex-Samson singer Gary Owen)
Bernie Tormé – Wild Irish (1997, A project with Anti-Nowhere League members Chris Jones and John Pearce)
Bernie Tormé – White Trash Guitar (1999, A project with Anti-Nowhere League members Chris Jones and John Pearce)
Bernie Tormé Band ― Punk Or What (recordings from 1976 to 1978 unreleased until 1999)
Bernie Tormé – Flowers & Dirt (2014)
Bernie Tormé – Blackheart (2015)
Bernie Tormé – Dublin Cowboy (2017)
Bernie Tormé – Shadowland (2018)

Live albums
Bernie Tormé – Live (1984)
Tormé –  Official Live Bootleg (1997)
Bernie Tormé And The Electric Gypsies ― Scorched Earth Live 1999–2000 (2001)
Bernie Tormé – Live in Sheffield 1983 (2002)

With Gillan
Mr. Universe (1979)
Glory Road (1980)
Future Shock (1981)
Double Trouble (1981)
The Gillan Tapes Vol. 1 (1997)
The Gillan Tapes Vol. 2 (1999)
The Gillan Tapes Vol. 3 (2000)
Triple Trouble (2009) (Recorded live 1981/1982)

With Atomic Rooster
Headline News (1983)
Live in Germany 1983 (released 2000)

With Desperado
Demo I + III (Demo) (1990)
Bloodied But Unbowed (1996)
Ace (2006)

With René Berg
The Leather, The Loneliness And Your Dark Eyes (1992)

With Silver (band fronted by Gary Barden)
Silver (2001)
Dream Machines (2002)
Intruder (2003)

With GMT
Cannonball (2006, EP)
Bitter And Twisted (2006)
Evil Twin (2008)
Raw – Live (2011)

References

External links
Bernie Tormé official website
Rock N Roll Universe Interview 2007
  Interview at Skylight Webzine 
Photo galleries of Bernie live (GMT and The Electric Gypsies)

2019 deaths
Irish rock guitarists
Irish male guitarists
Tormé members
The Ozzy Osbourne Band members
1952 births
Atomic Rooster members
Samson (band) members
Gillan (band) members
Musicians from Dublin (city)
Deaths from pneumonia in England
Quatermass (band) members